Frederick Barton (19 June 1900 – 20 November 1993) was a British modern pentathlete. He competed at the 1924 Summer Olympics.

He attended Eton and the Royal Military College, Sandhurst, and was commissioned into the 17th/21st Lancers and became a captain. He lived in Ireland where he was Royal Dublin Society president from 1966 until 1968.

References

External links
 

1900 births
1993 deaths
British male modern pentathletes
Olympic modern pentathletes of Great Britain
Modern pentathletes at the 1924 Summer Olympics
People from Paddington
Athletes from London
Graduates of the Royal Military College, Sandhurst
17th/21st Lancers officers
English expatriates in Ireland